NZ Endeavour is a yacht. She won the 1993–94 Whitbread Round the World Race skippered by Grant Dalton.

References

Volvo Ocean Race yachts
Sailing yachts of New Zealand
Sydney to Hobart Yacht Race yachts
Sailboat type designs by Bruce Farr